Klepikovo is a rural locality (a village) in Krasavinskoye Rural Settlement, Velikoustyugsky District, Vologda Oblast, Russia. The population was 29 as of 2002.

Geography 
Klepikovo is located 25 km northeast of Veliky Ustyug (the district's administrative centre) by road. Krasavino is the nearest rural locality.

References 

Rural localities in Velikoustyugsky District